The 2017 Jeux de la Francophonie, also known as VIIIèmes Jeux de la Francophonie (French for 8th Francophone Games), informally known as Abidjan 2017, took place in Abidjan, Ivory Coast, from July 21–30. This was the first edition of the games to be hosted in Ivory Coast.

Since 2011, it was the third international competition held in Abidjan, after the 2013 World Cup Taekwondo Team Championships and the 2013 AfroBasket.

Venues 
Ten cultural and sports venues will be situated in three geographic zones in Abidjan : 
 Zone A : Marcory and Treichville suburbs
 Zone B : Plateau suburb
 Zone C : Cocody suburb

Zone A (Marcory and Treichville)
 Stade Robert Champroux - Sporting competitions, Renovated in 2007
 Parc du Canal aux bois - Cultural events
 Palais des Sports de Treichville - Sporting competitions, Renovated in 2013
 Palace of Culture of Abidjan - Cultural events, Renovated in 2012
 Café-Théâtre, Centre national des arts et de la culture - Cultural events

Zone B (Le Plateau)
 Stade Félix Houphouët-Boigny - Sporting competitions, To be renovated
 Ivory Coast Museum of Civilisations - Cultural events
 National Library of Ivory Coast - Cultural events
 French Cultural Centre - Cultural events

Zone C (Cocody)
 Université Félix Houphouët-Boigny (campus) - Games village; Sporting competitions, Renovated in 2012

Participants
Of the 48 delegations participating, Kosovo and Ukraine were participating for the first time, while Laos returned to the Games for the first time since 2009.  Countries that participated in 2013 that did not return in 2017 were Andorra, Austria, Cyprus, Equatorial Guinea, Estonia, Guinea-Bissau, Montenegro, Poland, Rwanda, Saint Lucia, and Slovakia.

 French Community of Belgium

Events

Sports

  African wrestling (12)
  Athletics (42)
  Athletics (handicapped) (5)
  Basketball (1)
  Cycling (2)
  Football (soccer) (1)
  Judo (14)
  Table tennis (4)
  Wrestling (16)

Cultural

Digital creation
Ecological creation
Hip-hop dance
Juggling
Poetry
Painting
Photography
Puppetry
Sculpture
Song
Storytelling
Traditional inspiration dance

Medal table
Final medal tally below.

Medalists

African wrestling

Athletics

Basketball

Cultural

Cycling

Football

Judo
Men

Women

Para-athletics

Table tennis

Wrestling

References

External links
Official site
 Games 2017 at  jeux.francophonie.org
Livre des resultats

 
Jeux De La Francophonie, 2017
Jeux de la Francophonie
International sports competitions hosted by Ivory Coast